Manual image annotation is the process of manually defining regions in an image and creating a textual description of those regions. Such annotations can for instance be used to train machine learning algorithms for computer vision applications. 

This is a list of computer software which can be used for manual annotation of images.

References 

Lists of software